William S. Culbertson was once the richest man in Indiana.  He was born in New Market, Pennsylvania, and left at age 21 to find his fortune along the Ohio River.  He settled in New Albany, Indiana, taking a job as a dry goods clerk, but by 1860 had found his wealth in dry goods.  In 1868 he retired from dry goods to become an investor.  When he died in 1892, he was worth $3.5 million, leaving behind his third wife after two wives died before him.

Culbertson Mansion State Historic Site in New Albany, Indiana, was his home.

People from New Albany, Indiana
People from York County, Pennsylvania
Businesspeople from Indiana